Tomkins is a surname. Notable people with the surname include:

Adam Tomkins, British professor of law
Alan Tomkins (1939–2020), American art director
A. Pearce Tomkins (1875–1937), American farmer, lawyer, and politician
Calvin Tomkins (born 1925), American author and art critic
Edward Tomkins (1915–2007), British ambassador
Floyd W. Tomkins (1850–1932), Episcopal American deacon
James Tomkins (MP) (c.1569–1636), English Member of Parliament for Leominster 1624–28
James Tomkins (rower) (born 1965), Australian Olympic rower
James Tomkins (footballer) (born 1989), English footballer
Ken Tomkins (1917–1990), Australian politician
Joel Tomkins (born 1987), English rugby player
Leslie Tomkins (born 1948), English art director
Logan Tomkins (born 1992), English rugby player
Oliver Tomkins (1908–1992), Church of England priest, Bishop of Bristol
Paddy Tomkins (20th and 21st century), chief inspector of constabulary for Scotland
Richard Tomkins (born 1952), English journalist
Sam Tomkins (born 1989), English rugby player
Saskia Tomkins (20th and 21st centuries), British musician and actress
Silvan Tomkins (1911–1991), American psychologist
Thomas Tomkins (martyr) (died 1555), English Protestant martyr
Thomas Tomkins (1572–1656), Welsh composer
Trevor Tomkins (1941–2022), English jazz drummer
William Tomkins (17th century), English Member of Parliament

See also
 Tomkin
 Tompkins (surname)

English-language surnames
Patronymic surnames
Surnames from given names